Margit Graf (born March 20, 1951) is an Austrian luger who competed during the 1970s. She won the bronze medal in the women's singles event at the 1977 FIL World Luge Championships in Igls, Austria.

At the 1977 FIL European Luge Championships in Königssee, West Germany, Graf won a bronze medal in the women's singles event.

She also finished sixth in the women's singles event at the 1976 Winter Olympics in Innsbruck.

References

External links
Austrian Press Agency results on Top Ten of women's singles luge at the 1976 Winter Olympics in Innsbruck. - Accessed June 21, 2007 
Hickok sports information on World champions in luge and skeleton.
List of European luge champions 
SportQuick.com information on World champions in luge 

1951 births
Living people
Austrian female lugers
Olympic lugers of Austria
Lugers at the 1972 Winter Olympics
Lugers at the 1976 Winter Olympics
20th-century Austrian women
21st-century Austrian women